Alan McCullough may refer to:

 Alan McCullough (writer), television writer
 Alan McCullough (architect) (died 1993), American modernist architect
 Alan McCullough (loyalist) (1981–2003), high-ranking Ulster Defence Association member
 Alan McCullough (journalist) a 1970s and 1980s Irish news reporter